Hydrops triangularis, commonly known as the water false coral snake, triangle water snake, triangle watersnake, or water coral, is a species of snake endemic to northern South America and the Amazon Basin.

Geographic range
Hydrops triangularis is found in Venezuela, Trinidad and Tobago, Guyana, Suriname, French Guiana, Colombia, Brazil, eastern Ecuador, eastern Peru, and northern Bolivia.

Description

Diet
Hydrops triangularis feeds on eels (especially synbranchids) and other freshwater fish (especially elongated species).

References

Further reading
Boulenger GA. 1894. Catalogue of the Snakes in the British Museum (Natural History). Volume II., Containing the Conclusion of the Colubridæ Aglyphæ. London: Trustees of the British Museum (Natural History). (Taylor and Francis, printers). xi + 382 pp. + Plates I-XX. (Hydrops triangularis, p. 187).
Freiberg M. 1982. Snakes of South America. Hong Kong: T.F.H. Publications. 189 pp. . (Hydrops triangularis, p. 100).
Wagler J. 1824. In Spix J. 1824. Serpentum Brasiliensum species novae ou histoire naturelle des espèces nouvelles de serpens, recueillies et observées pendant le voyage dans l'intérieur du Brésil dans les années 1817, 1818, 1819, 1820, exécuté par ordre de sa Majesté le Roi de Baviére. Munich: Hübschmann. viii + 75 pp. + Plates I-II, IIa, IIb, III-XXVI. (Elaps triangularis, new species, pp. 5–6 + Plate IIa, [figure 2]). (in Latin).

Hydrops
Reptiles of Bolivia
Reptiles of Brazil
Reptiles of Colombia
Reptiles of Ecuador
Reptiles of Guyana
Reptiles of French Guiana
Reptiles of Peru
Reptiles of Suriname
Reptiles of Trinidad and Tobago
Reptiles of Venezuela
Taxa named by Johann Georg Wagler
Reptiles described in 1824
IUCN Red List data deficient species